Alec Vary (3 January 1908 – 28 March 1977) was an Australian rules footballer who played for the St Kilda Football Club in the Victorian Football League (VFL).

Notes

External links 

1908 births
1977 deaths
Australian rules footballers from Victoria (Australia)
St Kilda Football Club players
Morwell Football Club players